is a Quasi-National Park on the borders of Gunma and Nagano Prefectures, Japan. Established in 1969, the central feature of the park are Mounts  (1,423 m) and Myōgi (1,104 m).

Related municipalities
 Gunma: Annaka, Nanmoku, Shimonita, Tomioka, Ueno
 Nagano: Karuizawa, Kitaaiki, Miyota, Saku, Sakuho

See also

 National Parks of Japan

References

National parks of Japan
Parks and gardens in Gunma Prefecture
Parks and gardens in Nagano Prefecture
Protected areas established in 1969
1969 establishments in Japan